Georges Pouliot (February 6, 1923 – May 8, 2019) was a Canadian fencer. He competed in five events at the 1948 Summer Olympics.

References

1923 births
2019 deaths
Canadian male fencers
Olympic fencers of Canada
Fencers at the 1948 Summer Olympics
Fencers at the 1950 British Empire Games
Commonwealth Games medallists in fencing
Commonwealth Games silver medallists for Canada
Commonwealth Games bronze medallists for Canada
Medallists at the 1950 British Empire Games